Mark Schorer (May 17, 1908 – August 11, 1977) was an American writer, critic, and scholar born in Sauk City, Wisconsin.

Biography
Schorer earned an MA at Harvard and his Ph.D. in English at the University of Wisconsin–Madison in 1936. During his academic career, he held positions at Dartmouth, Harvard, and the University of California, Berkeley, where he chaired the Department of English from 1960 to 1965. A leading critic of his time, he was best known for his work, Sinclair Lewis: An American Life. Schorer was also the author of many short stories, which appeared in magazines such as The New Yorker, Harpers, The Atlantic Monthly, and Esquire.

Among his honors were three Guggenheim Fellowships, a Fulbright professorship at the University of Pisa and a fellowship at the Center for Advanced Study in Behavioral Sciences at Stanford. He also was elected to the American Academy of Arts and Sciences, the most prestigious honor society for creative arts in the country. 

Schorer was called as an expert witness during the 1957 obscenity trial over the Allen Ginsberg poem Howl, and testified in defense of the poem. This incident is dramatized in the film Howl (2010), in which Schorer is portrayed by Treat Williams.

In addition to his scholarly works, he also co-authored a series of science-fiction and horror stories with writer, publisher and childhood friend (both being natives of Sauk City, Wisconsin) August Derleth. These stories, originally published mainly in Weird Tales magazine during the 1920s and 1930s, were eventually anthologized in Colonel Markesan and Less Pleasant People (1966).

Schorer died from a blood infection following bladder surgery in Oakland, California at the age of 69.

Literary works
 A House Too Old (1935)
 William Blake: The Politics of Vision (1946)
 ‘’The State of Mind’’ (1947)
 Technique as Discovery (1948)
 Wars of Love (1954)
 Sinclair Lewis: An American Life (1961)
 Colonel Markesan and Less Pleasant People (1966) with August Derleth
 The World We Imagine (1968)
 Pieces of Life (1977)

See also

 August Derleth

References

External links
 A House Too Old at Wisconsin Alumni Association
 Mark Schorer at Wisconsin Library Association
 Mark Schorer at University of California, Berkeley
 Obituary in The New York Times
 "Sinclair Lewis and the Nobel Prize" in The Atlantic
 Works by Mark Schorer in The New Yorker

1908 births
1977 deaths
20th-century American novelists
American male novelists
Harvard University alumni
 University of Wisconsin–Madison College of Letters and Science alumni
Dartmouth College faculty
Harvard University faculty
University of California, Berkeley faculty
Academic staff of the University of Pisa
Novelists from Wisconsin
20th-century American male writers
Novelists from Massachusetts
People from Sauk City, Wisconsin